John Swegles Jr. (April 15, 1819December 17, 1861) was a Michigan politician.

Early life
Swegles was born on April 15, 1819 in Hector, New York.

Career
Swegles was the founder of St. Johns, Michigan. Swegles served as Michigan Auditor General from 1851 to 1854.

Personal life
Swegles married Harriet Coryell in 1840. Together they had at least three children.  Swegles was the father-in-law of Oliver L. Spaulding and grandfather of Oliver Lyman Spaulding.

Death
Swegles died in St. Johns, Michigan on December 17, 1861. He was interred at 	
Mount Rest Cemetery in St. Johns.

References

1819 births
1861 deaths
American city founders
Michigan Auditors General
People from St. Johns, Michigan
Burials in Michigan
19th-century American politicians